Ola Markus Steinholt (4 October 1934—20 April 2009) was a Norwegian bishop in the Church of Norway.

He was born in Trondenes, Norway in 1934.  He graduated from the University of Oslo with the cand.theol. degree in 1959. He was a parish priest in Vefsn starting in 1971, after having been a military chaplain for some time.  He served as dean in Tromsø Cathedral from 1984 to 1990 and bishop of the Diocese of Nord-Hålogaland from 1990 to 2001. He died in April 2009 in Tromsø, Norway.

References

1934 births
2009 deaths
Bishops of Hålogaland
20th-century Lutheran bishops
University of Oslo alumni
People from Harstad